Sonya Williams-Barnes (born April 18, 1969) is an American politician who was most recently a member of the Mississippi House of Representatives representing the 119th district from 2012 to 2022.

Williams-Barnes currently works with the Southern Poverty Law Center.

References

External links

1969 births
Living people
Democratic Party members of the Mississippi House of Representatives
21st-century American politicians
21st-century American women politicians
Jackson State University alumni